Paradise Beach is an Australian television series made by Village Roadshow Pictures. It was made in association with America's Genesis Entertainment which later merged with New World Television for the Nine Network, and aired between 1993 and 1994. Paradise Beach was intended not only as a rival to Australian soaps Neighbours and Home and Away, but also to be the first breakthrough Australian soap to air in the American market.

History

Production
Veteran Australian producer Jock Blair was the driving force behind Paradise Beach, with Nick McMahon as Executive Producer, and the first episodes of the soap were aimed at the American audience. Australian actress Tiffany Lamb used an American accent in her role as Lisa Whitman, and her opening storyline revolved around her childhood sweetheart Cooper Hart (played by Olivia Newton-John's then-husband Matt Lattanzi). Also appearing from the start were Robert Coleby (Chopper Squad, The Young Doctors) as Tom Barsby, and another familiar face was Andrew McKaige (Sons and Daughters, Prisoner) as Tom's younger brother Nick.

The rest of the original cast consisted of unknown actors all in their first acting roles. These included Ingo Rademacher, now famous for his separate roles in American series Titans and General Hospital. Here, he played Sean Hayden. His on-screen sister Tori, was played by Megan Connolly. The actress died on 6 September 2001 of a drug overdose, following short stints in Breakers and Home and Away. Finally, Raelee Hill was cast as scheming Loretta Taylor, Jaason Simmons was cast as bronzed lifeguard Harry Tait, Manu Bennett (credited as Jon Bennett) was cast as Kirk Barsby, son of Tom and his sister Cassie was played by Kimberley Joseph.

Retooling
When Paradise Beach was taken off the air in America, all traces of Americanism were removed and the producers concentrated on making the series work in its homeland and Europe. Matt Lattanzi departed, but not before Olivia Newton-John made a brief cameo, beaming down from the entrance of an aeroplane. Further additions to the cast included more experienced actors from other soaps including Melissa Bell from Neighbours as Emily Harris, and former-E Street regular Melissa Tkautz arrived as Vanessa Campbell. However, after two seasons, Nine Network eventually cancelled Paradise Beach after just 260 episodes.

After the series ended, Jaason Simmons joined the cast of Baywatch the following year. Kimberley Joseph featured in a recurring role in the cult-TV hit Lost as air hostess Cindy Chandler.

Reception
The series was largely savaged by the critics. With negative comparisons to the American shows Baywatch and Beverly Hills, 90210, the soap failed to make an impression in America in the Spring and Summer of 1993, as somewhat of a replacement for the similar style show Swans Crossing. In the UK, the soap was launched in a blaze of publicity on Sky Television in late October 1993 in the 6.30pm time slot with a 12.30pm repeat the following afternoon. Sky moved the more popular, but recently axed Australian soap opera, E Street to a weekend slot, but when Paradise Beach flopped in Britain as well as Australia, Sky moved E Street back to weekdays and Paradise Beach was screened at 6pm and mid day, creating an 'Aussie Soap Hour' for a few months until August 1994.  Grampian Television broadcast the full series, every Monday to Wednesday at 17.10 slot from September 1995 and until July 1997.  Many other countries around the world did broadcast the series.  The show has never been released on VHS or DVD or digitally.

Parody
Paradise Beach was parodied extensively on the ABC's Late Show, where it was mocked for its poor acting, formulaic plots and characterizations, characters dancing every time rock-and-roll music was played, and that it was effectively an infomercial for the various properties of Village Roadshow and Warner Bros. Movie World, which the skit characters would point out in a fourth wall break mentioning its shooting location.

Cast

Emily Harris - Melissa Bell
Kirk Barsby - Manu Bennett
Paula Taylor - Zoe Bertram
Ken Hayden - Michael Caton
Tom Barsby - Robert Coleby
Tori Hayden - Megan Connolly
Anna Ritchie - Deborah Coulls
Joan Hayden - Paula Duncan
Karen Wolfe - Rebekah Elmaloglou
Robyn Devereaux - Isla Fisher
Andrew - Shane Ammann
Brooke Bannister - Gabrielle Fitzpatrick
William "Grommet" Ritchie - Anthony Hayes
Loretta Taylor - Raelee Hill
Roy McDermott - John Holding
Sam Dexter - Richard Huggett

Cassie Barsby - Kimberley Joseph
David Finn - Tayler Kane
Nick Barsby - Andrew McKaige
Chris Quinn - Scott Michaelson
Craig Ritchie - Eric Oldfield
Patrick Worthing - Doug Penty
Sean Hayden - Ingo Rademacher
Harry Tait - Jaason Simmons
Alex Harding - Emma Skinner
Vanessa Campbell - Melissa Tkautz
Pam So Oy - Theresa Wong
Voice Over - Simon James

References

External links
 

Nine Network original programming
Australian television soap operas
1993 Australian television series debuts
1994 Australian television series endings
Television shows set in Gold Coast, Queensland
English-language television shows